Visser is a Dutch occupational surname, meaning "fisherman". In 2007, nearly 50,000 people in the Netherlands carried the name, making it the eighth most populous name in the country. Common variant forms of the name are De Visser, Visscher, and Vissers.

Geographical distribution
As of 2014, 43.7% of all known bearers of the surname Visser were residents of South Africa (frequency 1:870), 39.3% of the Netherlands (1:303), 4.8% of the United States (1:52,799), 3.3% of Mozambique (1:5,812), 2.1% of Canada (1:12,250), 1.6% of Australia (1:10,599) and 1.3% of Germany (1:42,516).

In the Netherlands, the frequency of the surname was higher than national average (1:303) in the following provinces:
 1. Friesland (1:94)
 2. Flevoland (1:165)
 3. Groningen (1:212)
 4. North Holland (1:222)
 5. South Holland (1:274)

In South Africa, the frequency of the surname was higher than national average (1:870) in the following provinces:
 1. Northern Cape (1:191)
 2. Western Cape (1:382)
 3. North West (1:755)
 4. Free State (1:816)
 5. Gauteng (1:830)

People
 A. G. Visser (1878–1929), Afrikaans poet
 Ad Visser (born 1947), Dutch radio presenter
 Adrie Visser (born 1983), Dutch cyclist
 Angela Visser (born 1966), Dutch model and actress
 Aron Visser (born 1999), South African cricketer
 Atie Visser (1914–2014), Dutch resistance fighter during World War II
 Barbara Visser (born 1977), Dutch politician
 Barbara Visser (artist) (born 1966), Dutch artist
 Barney Visser (born 1949), American businessman and racing team owner
 Beitske Visser (born 1995), Dutch racing driver
 Brian Visser (born 1987), American soccer goalkeeper
 Carel Visser (1928–2015), Dutch sculptor
 Christia Visser (born 1992), South African actress and singer
 Cor Visser (1903–1982), Dutch artist
 Cornelis Visser (born 1964), Dutch politician
 Danie Visser (born 1961), South African tennis player
 Dennis Visser (born 1993), South African rugby player
 Dennis Visser (born 1995), Dutch short track speed skater
 Eelco Visser (born 1966), Dutch computer scientist
 Elizabeth Visser (1908–1987), Dutch classical scholar
 Eric Visser (born 1951), Dutch publisher
 Esmee Visser (born 1996), Dutch speed skater
 Floris Visser (born 1983), Dutch opera director 
 Gerrit Visser (1903–1984), Dutch footballer
 Gian Visser (born 1975), South African IT entrepreneur
 Guido Visser (born 1970), Canadian cross-country skier
 Guillaume Visser (1880–1952), Belgian rower
 Henk Visser (collector) (1923–2006), Dutch arms and armory collector
 Henk Visser (long jumper) (1932–2015), Dutch long jumper
 Henk Visser (pediatrician) (born 1930), Dutch pediatrician
 Henk Visser (politician) (born 1946), Dutch politician
 Impi Visser (born 1995), South African rugby player
 Ingrid Visser (born 1966), New Zealand marine biologist
 Ingrid Visser (1977–2013), Dutch volleyball player
 Jenny Visser-Hooft (1888–1939), Dutch traveler, mountaineer, and naturalist, wife of Philips Visser 
 Jaco Visser (born c. 1970), South African rugby player
 John E. Visser (1920–1997), American University president
 Jurgen Visser (born 1989), South African rugby player
 Kevin Visser (born 1988), Dutch footballer
 Kyle Visser (born 1985), American basketball player
 Leo Visser (born 1966), Dutch speed skater
 Lesley Visser (born 1953), American sportscaster
  (1940–2014), Dutch operatic baritone and singing teacher
 Lucie Visser (born 1958), Dutch model and actress
 Margaret Visser (born 1940), Canadian writer and broadcaster
 Marius Visser (born 1982), Namibian rugby player
 Mark Visser (born 1983), Australian surfer
 Mart Visser (born 1968), Dutch fashion designer
 Martinus Visser (born 1924), Australian sailor
 Matt Visser, New Zealand mathematician
 Mattijs Visser (born 1958), Dutch organizer of art exhibitions 
 Maura Visser (born 1985), Dutch handballer
 Nadine Visser (born 1995), Dutch heptathlete
 Naomi Visser (born 2001), Dutch artistic gymnast
 Nikki Visser (born 1975), Australian model, television presenter, and actress
 Paul Calvin Visser (born c. 1936), American mayor of Flint, Michigan
 Philips Christiaan Visser (1882–1955), Dutch geographer, explorer, mountaineer, and diplomat
 Peter Visser (born 1960), New Zealand cricketer
 Piet Visser (born 1920), pseudonym of Belgian writer Lode Van Den Bergh
 Ria Visser (born 1961), Dutch speed skater and TV commentator
 Robert Visser (1860–1937), German photographer
 Rod Visser, Canadian politician
 Rokus Bernardus Visser (1914–1977), Dutch and later Indonesian Military commander
 Sanna Visser (born 1984), Dutch volleyball player
 Sep Visser (born 1990), Dutch rugby union player
 Sim Visser (1908–1983), Dutch politician
 Susan Visser (born 1965), Dutch film actress
 Thijs Visser (born 1989), Aruban sailor
 Tim Visser (born 1987), Dutch rugby player representing Scotland; brother of Sep
 Wayne Visser (born 1970), South African writer, academic, social entrepreneur and futurist 
 Werner Visser (born 1998), South African discus thrower
 Willem Jacob Visser (1915–1991), Dutch linguist
 Yge Visser (born 1963), Dutch chess player
 Yolandi Visser (born 1984), South African singer/rapper
 Yvonne Visser (born 1965), Canadian biathlete
 Zarck Visser (born 1989), South African long jumper

Compound names
 Haas Visser 't Hooft (1905–1977), Dutch field hockey player
 Willem Visser 't Hooft (1900–1985), Dutch secretary general of the World Council of Churches

References

Dutch-language surnames
Occupational surnames